"Flavor" is a song written and recorded by Tori Amos, originally appearing on her album Abnormally Attracted to Sin (2009) as a down-tempo song, and later released as the lead single from her album Gold Dust (2012) which features classical rearrangements of selected songs from her oeuvre.
Amos stated she felt the song was overlooked on its original album and had to be re-worked and noticed on Gold Dust.

Music video
The music video for "Flavor" was directed by Danielle Levitt and it features Amos walking the streets of New York City and encountering many different people, including skaters, gospel women from Harlem, drag queens, and breakdancers.

Peter Rauhofer mixes
In 2012 Peter Rauhofer, known for his dance remixes of several well known hits from artists including Cher, Madonna, Yoko Ono, and Pink, among others, was commissioned to remix the first single lifted from Gold Dust. An EP containing four remixes was released in late 2012. "Flavor" reached #1 on the Hot Dance Club Play chart in February 2013. This remix was Rauhofer's last mainstream release before his death in 2013.

Track listing
 "Flavor" (Club Mix) – 7:35
 "Flavor" (Big Room Mix) – 9:00
 "Flavor" (Old Skool Dub Mix) – 7:07
 "Flavor" (Club Mix Radio Edit) – 4:00

Personnel 
 Tori Amos – vocals, Bösendorfer piano, production
 John Philip Shenale – arrangements

Charts

Weekly charts

Year-end charts

See also
 List of number-one dance singles of 2013 (U.S.)

References

Tori Amos songs
2009 songs
2012 singles
Mercury Records singles
Songs written by Tori Amos
Trip hop songs